Elaeocarpus blascoi is a species of flowering plant in the Elaeocarpaceae family. It is found only in India. It is threatened by habitat loss.

See also
 List of Elaeocarpus species

References

blascoi
Endemic flora of India (region)
Endangered plants
Taxonomy articles created by Polbot